Jovan Deretić (22 January 1934 – 16 June 2002) was a Serbian historian and author of Serbian literary history. His work Istorija Srpske književnosti (1983) is the standard work in Serbian literary history. He is sometimes confused with pseudohistorian Jovan I. Deretić.

Deretić was born in the village of Orahovac near Trebinje on 22 January 1934. He completed gymnasium high school in Trebinje and Vrbas and graduated from the Faculty of Philosophy, University of Belgrade in 1958. He completed his doctoral degree in Belgrade as well in 1965 with a thesis under the title "Composition of the Gorski Vijenac".

Selected works

References

Serbian literary historians
20th-century Serbian historians
2002 deaths
1934 births
People from Trebinje
Serbs of Bosnia and Herzegovina